Urochloa is a genus of plants in the grass family, native to Eurasia, Africa, Australia, Mexico, and the Pacific Islands. Common names include signalgrass.

 Species
 Urochloa brachyura (Hack.) Stapf - E + S Africa
 Urochloa brizantha (Hochst. ex A.Rich.) R.Webster - native to tropical + S Africa; introduced and widely grown in S America + Pacific
 Urochloa echinolaenoides Stapf - Zaïre, Tanzania, Malawi, Zambia
 Urochloa fusca B.F. Hansen & Wunderlin browntop signalgrass - southern United States to Argentina
 Urochloa glumaris (Trin.) Veldkamp – Thurston grass - southern China, Southeast Asia, Indian subcon, islands of Pacific + Indian Oceans
 Urochloa longifolia B.S.Sun & Z.H.Hu - Yunnan
 Urochloa mosambicensis (Hack.) Dandy - Africa, Madagascar
 Urochloa oligotricha (Fig. & De Not.) Henrard - Africa
 Urochloa olivacea Sánchez-Ken - western Mexico (Colima, Nayarit)
 Urochloa panicoides P.Beauv. – panic liverseed grass - Africa, southern Asia
 Urochloa pauciflora Sánchez-Ken - western Mexico (Jalisco, Michoacán)
 Urochloa platyrrhachis C.E.Hubb. - Zambia, Zaïre
 Urochloa rudis Stapf - Somalia, Kenya, Tanzania
 Urochloa sclerochlaena Chiov - Ethiopia, Kenya
 Urochloa setigera (Retz.) Stapf  - Indian subcon, southern China, Southeast Asia
 Urochloa trichopodioides (Mez & K.Schum.) S.M.Phillips & S.L.Chen - Zaïre, Tanzania, Kenya, Ethiopia
 Urochloa trichopus (Hochst.) Stapf - drier parts of Africa, Arabian Pen
 Urochloa venosa (Swallen) Morrone & Zuloaga - western Mexico (Michoacán)

 Formerly included

Numerous species once considered members of Urochloa but are now regarded as better suited to other genera, such as Alloteropsis, Brachiaria, Ixophorus, Oplismenus, Panicum, and Rupichloa.

References

External links

Panicoideae
Poaceae genera
Grasses of Africa
Grasses of Asia
Grasses of Europe
Grasses of North America
Grasses of Oceania
Grasses of South America
Taxa named by Palisot de Beauvois
Cereals